South Carolina Highway 162 (SC 162) is a  state highway in the U.S. state of South Carolina. The highway connects Adams Run and Rantowles, via Hollywood.

Route description
SC 162 begins at an intersection with SC 174 in Adams Run, within Charleston County. It travels to the east-southeast and almost immediately curves to the east-northeast. A short distance later, it enters Hollywood. It has an intersection with SC 164 at its eastern terminus. It passes R. D. Schroder Middle School and C.C. Blaney Elementary School. After passing Baptist Hill High School, the highway crosses over Lower Toogoodoo Creek. In the main part of the town, it has an intersection with SC 165 at the Herbert Gadson Intersection. SC 162 passes the Lowcountry Leadership Charter School before traveling along the southern edge of Dungannon Heritage Preserve/Wildlife Management Area. It then crosses over Log Bridge Creek on an unnamed bridge. The highway then enters Rantowles, where it meets its eastern terminus, an intersection with U.S. Route 17 (US 17; Savannah Highway).

Major intersections

See also

References

External links

SC 162 at Virginia Highways' South Carolina Highways Annex

162
Transportation in Charleston County, South Carolina